María Corina Machado Parisca (born 7 October 1967, sometimes referred to as MCM) is a Venezuelan politician who served as an elected member of the National Assembly of Venezuela from 2011 to 2014. She was a candidate for Venezuelan president in the 2012 elections and has indicated that she would run again in 2019 if disputed interim President Juan Guaidó were to call for elections.

During the 2014 Venezuelan protests, Machado was one of the lead figures in organizing protests against the government of Nicolás Maduro.

Machado was the founder and former leader of the Venezuelan volunteer civil organization Súmate, alongside Alejandro Plaz. She was charged (together with other Súmate representatives) with conspiracy for funds Súmate received from the National Endowment for Democracy (NED), triggering condemnation of the administration of Venezuelan President Hugo Chávez from human rights groups supported by NED. The trial was suspended in February 2006 because of due process violations by the trial judge, and has been postponed several times according to Human Rights Watch. In 2018, she was listed as one of BBC's 100 Women.

Early life and education
Machado was born on 7 October 1967 as the oldest of four sisters. She is the daughter of Henrique Machado Zuloaga, a prominent steel businessman and Corina Parisca, a psychologist. Her ancestors included the author of the 1881 classic  Venezuela Heroica and a relative who was killed in an uprising against Venezuelan dictator Juan Vicente Gómez.

Machado has a degree in industrial engineering from Andrés Bello Catholic University and a master's degree in finance from Instituto de Estudios Superiores de Administración (IESA, business school) in Caracas. She was also part of Yale University's World Fellows Program in 2009.

In 1992 Machado – a mother of three – started Fundación Atenea (Atenea Foundation), a foundation using private donations to care for orphaned and delinquent Caracas street children; she also served as chair of the Opportunitas Foundation. After working in the auto industry in Valencia she moved in 1993 to Caracas. Because of her subsequent role in Súmate, Machado left the foundation so that it would not be politicized.

Súmate 

According to The Washington Post, the founding of Venezuelan volunteer civil organization Súmate resulted from a hurried encounter between Machado and Alejandro Plaz in a hotel lobby in 2001, where they shared their concern about the course that was being shaped for Venezuela. Machado said, "Something clicked. I had this unsettling feeling that I could not stay at home and watch the country get polarized and collapse .... We had to keep the electoral process but change the course, to give Venezuelans the chance to count ourselves, to dissipate tensions before they built up. It was a choice of ballots over bullets."

In 2004, Súmate led a petition drive for a constitutional presidential recall of Venezuelan President Hugo Chávez. According to CBS News, Chávez branded the leaders of Súmate as conspirators, coup plotters and lackeys of the U.S. government. After the referendum, members of Súmate were charged with treason and conspiracy, under Article 132 of the Venezuelan Penal Code, for receiving financial support for their activities from the NED. The Wall Street Journal in 2005 said Machado faced conspiracy charge stemming from the $31,000 grant from the NED for "non-partisan educational work". Also in 2005, The New York Times said she was "the Venezuelan government's most detested adversary, a young woman with a quick wit and machine-gun-fast delivery who often appears in Washington or Madrid to denounce what she calls the erosion of democracy under President Hugo Chávez", and says the Venezuelan government considers her "a member of a corrupt elite that is doing the bidding of the much reviled Bush administration". The attack affected Machado, the Bishop of Ciudad Guayana, Mariano Parra, and other citizens in the area. Soon after, the National Guard intervened to disperse the attack.

While heading a meeting in Caricuao on 30 July 2014, members of colectivos attacked Machado. The vehicle Machado was traveling in was heavily damaged, with the body and windows of the vehicle being struck with gun handles, sticks and stones. Machado escaped and was then moved to the assembly place while colectivos followed breaking down the door where they then left the scene after confrontations with residents protecting Machado.

Awards and recognition 

U.S. President George W. Bush welcomed Machado to the Oval Office in May 2005. After meeting with Machado and discussing Súmate's "efforts to safeguard the integrity and transparency of Venezuela's electoral process", a White House spokesperson said, "[t]he President expressed his concerns about efforts to harass and intimidate Súmate and its leadership". Venezuela's foreign minister called Machado's meeting with Bush "a provocation," while Venezuela's interior minister said that she is a puppet of the CIA.

Machado was hailed by National Review in 2006 as "the best of womankind and the difficult times many women face around the globe" on a list of Women the World Should Know for International Women's Day.

In 2009, Machado was chosen out of 900 applicants as one of 15 accepted to the Yale World Fellows Program. The Yale University program, "aim[s] to build a global network of emerging leaders and to broaden international understanding worldwide. ... 'Each of the 2009 Yale World Fellows has demonstrated an outstanding record of accomplishment and unlimited potential for future success,' said Program Director Michael Cappello".  The Yale World Fellows Program press release said, "Machado devotes herself to defending democratic institutions and civil liberties through SUMATE, the nation's leading watchdog for electoral transparency." Machado would later graduate from the program.

Awards
 2005 – Meritorious Achievement Award by the Ballenger Foundation
 2015 – Cádiz Cortes Ibero-American Freedom Prize was awarded "given the unblemished defense of freedom in your community and minimum requirements of the realization of human rights in the same, which has led them to be subject to public rebuke of their government, including the flagrant situation of imprisonment or the cutting of your minimal civil rights".
 2018 - BBC's 100 Most Influential Women
 2019 - Prize for Freedom

Personal life
Machado is divorced and has three children from that marriage.

References

External links 

Official Súmate website
Maria Corina Machado's Flickr photostream
2010 Election website

1967 births
Community activists
Venezuelan Roman Catholics
Human rights abuses in Venezuela
Living people
Venezuelan democracy activists
People from Caracas
Members of the National Assembly (Venezuela)
Andrés Bello Catholic University alumni
Justice First politicians
21st-century Venezuelan women politicians
21st-century Venezuelan politicians
Venezuelan anti-communists
Conservatism in Venezuela
Venezuelan human rights activists
Women human rights activists
Venezuelan feminists
People of the Crisis in Venezuela
Venezuelan women activists
BBC 100 Women
Venezuelan women engineers
Signers of the Madrid Charter